Me Without You is a 2001 British film starring Anna Friel, Michelle Williams, and Oliver Milburn, and written and directed by Sandra Goldbacher.

The film follows the troubled relationship between two girls as they grow up. Stephen Holden of The New York Times called it "psychologically savvy ... story of a toxic friendship, established in early childhood, whose poisons continue to circulate and infect both well into their adult lives."

Plot 

This drama charts the development of the friendship between two different girls living in the UK, Holly (Michelle Williams) and Marina (Anna Friel), from their teenage years during the late 1970s to the present day.

The first scene depicts the girls at 12 years old in 1973. Although they are next-door neighbours, they come from different backgrounds.  Holly is Jewish and has an overprotective mother, while Marina has a mother who is much more laid back and a father who is almost never around.  At this point, Holly develops a crush on Marina's older brother, Nat.

The film then cuts to 1978, which finds them lying on Marina's bed smoking because they're bored.  Later, Marina runs over to Holly's house to tell her that she has found out about a party that Nat's girlfriend, Carolyn, is having.  When the girls get to the party, the others ask if they would like to "play a game", although the "game" simply involves shooting heroin.  Nat's girlfriend soon leaves with two other guys;  while Marina wants to follow them, Holly begs her not to. However, when Marina gets up to leave, Holly kisses Nat and the two end up sleeping together. Marina sees them and becomes angry, telling Holly that Nat only had sex with her because he was stoned and probably did not even recognize her.  The next morning, Nat wakes up Marina and asks her to give a note to Holly that says what happened last night was "beautiful" but a case of bad timing, and that he looks forward to their future. However, Marina angrily rips up the note and goes to see Holly who is sitting in her yard reading a book. When Holly asks Marina if Nat said anything about the night before, Marina lies, and says "no", but reassures Holly that they will always have each other.

The film then jumps to 1982, when Holly and Marina are attending university together. They are sleeping with the same professor; a man that Marina had at first thought boring. Nat comes to visit, and he and Holly reconnect.  Holly decides she wants to be with him. But, when she goes to end things with her professor, she sees Marina kissing him goodbye. She runs back to Nat, so upset she forgets about the relationship they were about to enter. Holly soon confronts Marina and the two fight. While Marina soon makes up with Holly, she ruins things between Holly and Nat by telling them both that the other one did not want to talk.  Later on, the three of them are reunited at a New Year's party, where Nat announces his intention to marry his girlfriend, Isabel.

The next scene finds the girls in their late 20s, in 1989. Holly is a writer, dating a man Marina has chosen for her. Marina is dating a Jewish doctor. Nat comes over to Holly's place and tells her he talks to her in his head all the time.  They are interrupted by Holly's boyfriend returning, at which point she tells Nat to leave. Shortly thereafter, she decides she wants to go to America, but Marina tries to stop her by telling her she is pregnant.

Some time later, the characters are reunited at another New Year's Eve party. While playing "Guess Who?", Nat begins to describe someone in a very deep way. Holly guesses Isabel, but Isabel claims it's Holly. Marina says she's bored with this game and they should play sardines. As they wander through the dark house, Marina begins to kiss Holly's boyfriend.  Holly and Nat then find each other, however, and Holly tells him she also talks to him all the time in her head. When Holly's boyfriend refuses her advances, Marina freaks out and runs outside. Holly confronts her, and tells her they have to stop being friends. Marina tells her "there's no me without you!" Holly tells her there is. As Holly walks away, Nat catches up to her and asks if he can come. The two take a bus together.

The final scene finds the characters in 2001. Nat and Holly have a daughter, and Marina has a daughter and a son. Marina and Holly do not appear as close as they once were, although each accepts the other's presence for the sake of their two young daughters, who appear to be best friends.

Cast
 Anna Friel as  Marina
 Anna Popplewell as  Young Marina
 Michelle Williams as  Holly Rossman
 Ella Jones as  Young Holly Rossman
 Kyle MacLachlan as Daniel
 Oliver Milburn as Nat
 Cameron Powrie as  Young Nat
 Trudie Styler as  Linda
 Marianne Denicourt as Isabel
 Adrian Lukis as Leo
 Steve John Shepherd as Carl
 Allan Corduner as  Max
 Nicky Henson as  Ray

Reception

On Rotten Tomatoes the film has an approval rating of 66% based on 65 reviews. On Metacritic the film has a score of 67% based on reviews from 25 critics, indicating "generally favorable reviews".

Roger Ebert of the Chicago Sun-Times gave the film 3 and a half stars and said the film "has a bracing truth that's refreshing after the phoniness of female-bonding pictures like Divine Secrets of the Ya-Ya Sisterhood."  He said that the film's treatment of character of Daniel was "rare" for a film of this sort in that had a "depth"  "instead of simply being used as a plot ploy." He called Williams' performance a "surprise" for having a "perfectly convincing British accent, and is cuddly and smart both at once." Stephen Holden of The New York Times wrote: "Under its drab contemporary trappings, the movie, is really a Jane Austen-like moral parable in which goodness is rewarded and selfishness punished." Lou Carlozo of the Chicago Tribune praised the on screen chemistry between Friel and Williams.

Critic Richard Nilsen, said "Although the film deserves some points for trying to describe the intensity of best-friendship between girls, it fails to make them interesting people." Lou Lumenick of the New York Post called it "The kind of chick flick that gives chick flicks a bad name." Lumenick praised the performances but wrote "it plods on with a wearying predictability and some truly terrible dialogue."

References

External links
 
 

2001 films
2000s female buddy films
2001 drama films
British female buddy films
British coming-of-age drama films
2000s coming-of-age drama films
Films set in the 1980s
Films set in Brighton
Films set in England
Fireworks Entertainment films
2000s English-language films
2000s British films